Pavel Aleksandrovich Sergeyev (born 20 June 1993) is a Russian former professional football player.

Club career
He made his Russian Premier League debut on 21 March 2015 for FC Arsenal Tula in a game against PFC CSKA Moscow.

References

External links
 

1993 births
People from Kamyshin
Living people
Russian footballers
Association football midfielders
FC Arsenal Tula players
FC Tekstilshchik Ivanovo players
FC Spartak Moscow players
FC Ararat Moscow players
Russian Premier League players
Russian expatriate footballers
Expatriate footballers in Armenia
FC Olimp-Dolgoprudny players
Sportspeople from Volgograd Oblast